The Michigan Auditor General is the chief fiscal officer of the State of Michigan. The Office of the Auditor General was established in 1836 and, with changes to the Michigan Constitution in 1963, has become the independent oversight arm of the Legislature. The first Michigan Auditor General was Robert Abbott. The first Republican in office (1863) was Emil Anneke, an active abolitionist, Forty-Eighter of German Origin and younger brother of U.S. colonel and German 1849 revolutionary leader Fritz Anneke. In 1959, lawyer and NAACP activist Otis M. Smith was elected Michigan Auditor General, as one of the first African Americans to serve in a senior state government office.

The current Michigan Auditor General, Doug A. Ringler, C.P.A, C.I.A, was appointed by the Michigan Legislature effective June 9, 2014.

List of Michigan Auditors General since 1836

See also 
 Governor of Michigan
 Michigan Attorney General
 Michigan General Assembly
 Michigan State Capitol

References

External links 
 Office of the Michigan Auditor General

1839 establishments in Michigan
 
Michigan